The Snake Corps are an indie band based in London, England.

History 
Formed in 1984, from the ashes of the (then) broken-up Sad Lovers & Giants, Tristan Garel-Funk and Nigel Pollard conceived the band, but Pollard left prior to recording the first album. Vocalist Marc Lewis responded to an advert in Melody Maker for a singer and shared a flat with Garel-Funk, the pair recruited Liam McGuinness on Bass and John Greville of Rudimentary Peni on drums.

The music was an original fusion of post-punk, indie rock and a dynamic guitar and vocal soundscape. Not unlike Sad Lovers & Giants before them, they focused on creating dreamy rock anthems and at least partly, discarded the post-punk influences of many their contemporaries. Consequently, the band found that the European market was more aligned to their musical style and they toured abroad extensively.

Distancing themselves from Britain and shunning UK dates meant that the regular indie labels were largely uninterested. However, Midnight Music, who had been the home of early SL&G, signed the band. 
A new album was already recorded, but this did not surface for some years, eventually appearing on the small Ophidian label, an offshoot of Rotator Records, thanks to a friend of Garel-Funk. The word Ophidian can mean 'snake-like'.

The Snake Corps reformed in 2010. Carl Jones joined on guitar, Liam McGuinness rejoined on Bass with a new drummer Richie Harris. The Snake Corps made a triumphant return to live performance with a gig in Salamandra Venue Barcelona, Spain on 18 September 2010.

The reformed Snake Corps with Marc on lead vocals were busy in 2011, playing gigs in London and Berlin with Steve Williams on lead guitar. Now with 3 original members they also played several sell out gigs in Spain in the autumn of 2011 (including the Rock Kitchen in Madrid) these now featured Simon Meek on keyboards, with Liam McGuinness moving to guitar, and original bass player Jim Blanchard also rejoining the band, with Dave Vigay on drums.

The band played London's 02 Academy in Islington on 21 April 2012 supporting Chameleons Vox and had their best gig since reforming 2 years before.

Carl Jones joined again on guitar for gigs in Spain in 2014 (Valencia) and 2015 (Tarragona) and left the band in 2016. They released a new EP featuring four new songs in September 2016. Gigs followed in Berlin in October and Madrid in November. They played their first-ever gig in Italy in Salerno in 17 April and play with their old friends the Chameleons Vox in Brighton in 17 May.

Current lineup
Marc Lewis – Vocals
Liam McGuinness – Guitar
Jim Blanchard – Bass
David Vigay – Drums

Previous members
Tristan Garel-Funk/Carl Jones/Steve Williams -Guitars
David Wood/Ian Gibson/Simon Meek/Will Hicks – Keyboards
Nigel Pollard/Jon Greville/Richard Harris – Drums

Discography

Albums
1985:  Flesh On Flesh – Midnight Music – CHIME 00.14CD
1990:  Smother Earth – Midnight Music – CHIME 00.52CD
1993:  3rd Cup – Ophidian – OPHD 3001

EPs
2016:  "The Ocean Calls" – The Snake Corporation

Singles
1985:  "Science Kills" – Midnight Music – DONG 13
1986:  "Victory Parade" – Midnight Music – DONG 19
1987:  "Testament" – Midnight Music – DONG 30
1989:  "Calling You" "This is Seagull" – Midnight Music – DONG 50
1990:  "Colder Than The Kiss" – Midnight Music – DONG 60
1992:  "Some Other Time" – Midnight Music – DONG 75
2019: "She'll Rise"

Compilations
1990:  More Than The Ocean – Midnight Music – CHIME 1.12CD
1993:  Spice 1984–1993: The Very Best Of – Anagram Records – CDMGRAM 97

References

External links
Official website
Official Facebook page
Official Twitter page
Marc Lewis's solo site

English rock music groups
British indie rock groups